The Spengler Cup is an annual invitational ice hockey tournament held in Davos, Switzerland. First held in 1923, the Spengler Cup is often cited as the oldest invitational ice hockey tournament in the world. The event is hosted by the Swiss team HC Davos and played each year in Davos from 26 December to 31 inclusively. Currently, all games are held at the Eisstadion Davos.

It was originally devised by Dr. Carl Spengler as a means to promote teams from German-speaking Europe, who might have suffered ostracism in the aftermath of World War I. Eventually, the tournament grew well beyond expectations. Many of Europe's most prestigious clubs and national programs have appeared, including Soviet, Czechoslovak, Swedish, German, and Finnish powerhouses. Through its history, club or national teams from 13 countries have won the tournament, with Team Canada winning the most cups as a club (16) while various teams from Switzerland have won the most cups for one country (20).

Among non-European organizations, Team Canada, Team USA, nationally ranked U.S. collegiate teams, reigning AHL Calder Cup and Ontario Hockey Association champions, and even Team Japan (in 1971, building international experience before playing as hosts of the 1972 Sapporo Winter Olympics) have competed for the Spengler Cup. Since at least 1990, Team Canada has been the only participant from North America, with the exception of the AHL's Rochester Americans in 1996 and 2013 (see AHL participation at the Spengler Cup). 

In the 2018 tournament, Finnish club team KalPa from the city of Kuopio defeated Team Canada 2–1 in the final. The game was decided in the 8th round of a shootout, the first series of game-winning shots in tournament history that determined the winner of the Spengler Cup.

The Spengler Cup tournament was not played in 2020 or 2021 due to the COVID-19 pandemic. In the 2022 tournament, Swiss club team HC Ambrì-Piotta defeated Sparta Prague 3–2 in the final; with the game decided in the 5th round of a shootout.

History

Many participating teams are club teams, rather than national teams, where a club team might have players from many nations on the roster. The first tournament was won in 1923 by the Oxford University Ice Hockey Club, composed of Canadians studying at the University of Oxford.

The first 24 tournaments were dominated by host HC Davos (7 wins, 12 runners-up) and the Czechoslovak club team LTC Prague (7 wins, 2 runners-up). The LTC Prague team was shut down by the Czechoslovak communist authorities after players defected at the 1948 Spengler Cup tournament. Between 1965 and 1983, the tournament was dominated by various Czechoslovak and Soviet teams. Since joining the tournament in 1984, Team Canada has been the dominant participant, with 16 wins and 10 runners-up. Team Canada is made up of Canadians predominantly playing in Europe, as the tournament occurs during the NHL and AHL seasons, though active NHL stars Joe Thornton and Rick Nash played for HC Davos during the 2004–05 NHL lockout.

From its inception until 1978, the tournament was played on an outdoor rink. The outdoor rink still exists outside the indoor arena, and is one of the largest outdoor rinks in the world. Starting in 1978, all tournament games have been played indoors. 

The Spengler Cup was cancelled in 2020 due to the COVID-19 pandemic. While the tournament was scheduled to return in 2021, Team Canada withdrew from the competition due to problems scheduling a quarantine isolation period before the start of play, and HC Ambrì-Piotta withdrew from the competition due to COVID-19 cases among the club's players. The 2021 event was ultimately cancelled on 25 December due to COVID-19 cases within HC Davos.

Sponsorship
The Spengler Cup is the second-largest sporting event in Switzerland, after tennis' Swiss Indoors in Basel. The tournament had a budget of CHF 11 million in 2016. About 40% of the total tournament budget amount comes from corporate sponsors. Since 1985, UBS has been the main sponsor and presenting partner of the Spengler Cup. Other current major sponsors are Würth, Schenker Storen, Škoda, Calanda, and McDonald's – each of whom, along with UBS, are the main tournament sponsor of one of the six teams each year.

International broadcasts
The Spengler Cup is broadcast on Schweizer Radio und Fernsehen in Switzerland, on Eurosport 2 in most of Europe, on Match TV and NTv2 in Russia, on Sport1 in Czechia, Slovakia and Hungary, on Šport TV in Slovenia, on TSN and RDS in Canada and on the free-to-air channel FreeSports in the United Kingdom.

Spengler Cup winners 

Notes
1

Performances

By club

Notes
1 
2

By nation

Notes
1 
2 
3 
4 
5 
6 
7

References

External links

 Spengler Cup 
 NHL.com article on Spengler Cup
 Archive of Hockey Results

 
Sport in Davos
International ice hockey competitions hosted by Switzerland
December sporting events